Gagari may refer to:

Daitō Islands, for which Gagari is an alternate name
The inhabitants of Gagra, in Abkhazia, Georgia